Sreekanteswaram Mahadeva Temple is an ancient Shiva temple situated in Thiruvananthapuram, in the Indian state of Kerala. Pazhaya Sreekanteswaram Temple is the original abode of the Lord.

Deities and sub-deities

Lord Shiva is the temple's Presiding Deity. Although his consort Sree Parvati has no idol, she is ever-present in the Sanctum. A Sanctum for Lord Sastha is within the Chuttambalam. Lord Ganapati, the serpent gods and Lord Krishna dwell outside the Chuttambalam. Many devotees argue that the idol worshipped as Bhootathan is actually a Yakshi. Lord Hanuman and Lord Murugan, both carved on pillars near the flagmast, receive worship. All the deities face east.

Adjacent to the shrine of Ganapati stands an idol of Goddess Parashakti who was worshiped in a nearby Kalari. In the Kalari she was worshipped with 'makaara panchakam' in the Shakteya Sampradaya. Mritunjaya Homam, Mrityunjaya archana, Jaladhara, Pinvilakku and Kuvala mala samarpanam are the most popular offerings made to Lord Shiva.

Management

The temple is under the control of Travancore Devaswom Board.

Important days

Maha Shivaratri and Thiruvathira attract crowds to the temple and Thiruvathira day of Malayalam month Dhanu.

References

Hindu temples in Thiruvananthapuram
Shiva temples in Kerala